Molloko (possibly from Aymara for round, round head and swirl) is an archaeological site in Peru. It is located in the Puno Region, Puno Province, Acora District, about 5 km south of the town of Acora, near the village of Molloco. The site was declared a National Cultural Heritage (Patrimonio Cultural) by the National Institute of Culture.

See also 
Kenko, Puno

References 

Archaeological sites in Peru
Archaeological sites in Puno Region